Old Fort is a census-designated place located in northern Pleasant Township, Seneca County, Ohio, United States; located about a mile east of Ohio State Route 53 where N. Township Rd. 73 intersects with E. County Rd. 51. The ZIP code is 44861.
 

Old Fort was platted in 1882, and named after Fort Seneca, a fort built during the War of 1812. A post office has been in operation at Old Fort since 1882.
Old Fort High School is located on N. County Road 51.

Geography 
Old Fort sits adjacent to the Sandusky River, which is a tributary to Lake Erie.

Demographics

Notable people

 Paul Gillmor, Republican U.S. representative representing the Ohio 5th District from 1988 to 2007.

References

Census-designated places in Seneca County, Ohio
Census-designated places in Ohio